Fleetwood power stations were two generating stations that supplied electricity to the town of Fleetwood, England and the surrounding area from 1900 to 1981. The first station was owned by the Fleetwood and District Electric Light and Power Syndicate and later by Fleetwood Urban District Council. The second station was owned and operated by the state following the nationalisation of the British electricity supply industry in 1948; this power station was decommissioned in October 1981.

History 
In 1890 the Urban District Council of Fleetwood applied for a Provisional Order under the Electric Lighting Acts to generate and supply electricity to the town. This was granted by the Board of Trade and was confirmed by Parliament through the Electric Lighting Orders Confirmation (No. 2) Act 1890 (53 & 54 Vict. c. cxxxvii). However, no scheme was built. In 1896 the Council transferred the Provisional Order to the Fleetwood and District Electric Light and Power Syndicate Limited. The syndicate was registered on 9 October 1896. The Council retained the right to purchase the undertaking at the end of 21 years and at 7-yearly intervals thereafter.

The power station was built in Copse Road Fleetwood (53°55'01"N 3°01'10"W).

Equipment specification
By 1923 the Urban District Council were operating the station. Generating plant comprised:

 Coal-fired boilers generating steam at up to 45,000 lb/h (5.67 kg/s) steam was supplied to:
 Generators
 1 × 120 kW reciprocating engine driving a generator
 1 × 300 kW reciprocating engine driving a generator
 1 × 540 kW steam turbo-generator

These machines gave a total generating capacity of 960 kW of direct current.

Consumer electricity supplies were 400 & 200 Volts DC.

Coal was delivered to a dedicated railway siding.

Second station 1955–1981
The new power station was sanctioned by the British Electricity Authority in June 1950. The first generating set was commissioned in May 1955, the second in August 1955 and the third set in December 1955. The plant comprised:

 3 × 300,000 lb/h (37.8 kg/s) boilers, steam conditions 625 psi and 865 °F (43.1 bar, 463 °C). Pulverised fuel firing. No. 1 and No. 2 boilers by Simon-Carves, No. 3 boiler by Richardsons-Westgarth.
 3 × English Electric 30 MW turbo-alternators, generating at 11.8 kV.

The total installed generating capacity was 90 MW, with an output capacity of 84 MW.

Condenser cooling water was cooled in two 3 million gallons per hour (3.79 m3/s) Fred Mitchell & Son concrete cooling towers, additional water was drawn from the Wyre Dock and reservoir.

Operations

Operating data 1921–23
The operating data is shown in the table:

Under the terms of the Electricity (Supply) Act 1926 (16 & 17 Geo. 5 c. 51) the Central Electricity Board (CEB) was established in 1926. The CEB identified high efficiency ‘selected’ power stations that would supply electricity most effectively. The CEB also constructed the national grid (1927–33) to provide regional connections between power stations.

The British electricity supply industry was nationalised in 1948 under the provisions of the Electricity Act 1947 (10 & 11 Geo. 6 c. 54). Ownership of power stations and main transmission lines  was vested in the British Electricity Authority, and subsequently the Central Electricity Authority and the Central Electricity Generating Board (CEGB). At the same time the electricity distribution and sales responsibilities of local electricity undertakings were transferred to Area Electricity Boards, in Fleetwood this was the North Western Electricity Board (NORWEB).

Operating data 1956–79
Operating data is shown in the table:

The data demonstrates the decline in load factor and electricity supplied in the late 1960s and 1970s.

Closure
Fleetwood power station was decommissioned on 31 October 1981. The buildings were subsequently demolished and the area has been turned into Fleetwood Marsh Nature Reserve.

See also

 Timeline of the UK electricity supply industry
 List of power stations in England

References

Coal-fired power stations in England
Demolished power stations in the United Kingdom
Former coal-fired power stations in the United Kingdom
Former power stations in England
1900 establishments in England
1981 disestablishments in England
Energy infrastructure completed in 1900
Energy infrastructure completed in 1955
Buildings and structures in Fleetwood